The 3 arrondissements of the Vienne department are:
 Arrondissement of Châtellerault, (subprefecture: Châtellerault) with 92 communes.  The population of the arrondissement was 109,345 in 2016.
 Arrondissement of Montmorillon, (subprefecture: Montmorillon) with 91 communes. The population of the arrondissement was 67,025 in 2016.
 Arrondissement of Poitiers, (prefecture of the Vienne department: Poitiers) with 83 communes. The population of the arrondissement was 259,699 in 2016.

History

In 1800 the arrondissements of Poitiers, Châtellerault, Civray, Loudun and Montmorillon were established. The arrondissement of Civray and Loudun were disbanded in 1926. 

The borders of the arrondissements of Vienne were modified in January 2017:
 four communes from the arrondissement of Châtellerault to the arrondissement of Poitiers
 one commune from the arrondissement of Montmorillon to the arrondissement of Châtellerault
 two communes from the arrondissement of Montmorillon to the arrondissement of Poitiers

References

Vienne